Manigault is a surname of French origin that derives from the German managwald (manig (many) + wald, walt (power)). Notable people with the surname include:

People 
 Arthur Middleton Manigault (1824-1886), Confederate General of the American Civil War
 Earl Manigault (1944–1998), American basketball player
 Edward Middleton Manigault (1887–1922), American Modernist painter
 Elizabeth Wragg Manigault (1736–1773), socialite and wife of Peter Manigault
 Gabriel Manigault (1758–1809), U.S. architect
 Gabriel Manigault (merchant) (1704–1781), U.S. merchant
 Mary Jane Manigault (1913–2010)
 Omarosa Manigault (born 1974), U.S. TV personality
 Peter Manigault (1731–1773), Charleston, South Carolina attorney, plantation owner, and colonial legislator
 Charles Manigault Morris (1820–1895), naval officer in C.S.A. and U.S.A. services

Characters 
 Aaron Manigault, and Devar Manigault, fictional characters from the U.S. TV series The Wire

See also 
 Joseph Manigault House, in Charleston, South Carolina, USA

References